Prosper is an unincorporated community in Canton Township, Fillmore County, Minnesota, United States.

History
A post office called Prosper was established in 1866 and remained in operation until it was discontinued in 1979.

Geography
The community is located between Canton, Minnesota and Burr Oak, Iowa on U.S. Highway 52.

State Highway 44 (MN 44) and State Line Road are both in the vicinity.

ZIP codes 55954 (Mabel) and 55922 (Canton) meet at Prosper.

References

 Rand McNally Road Atlas – 2007 edition – Minnesota entry
 Official State of Minnesota Highway Map – 2011/2012 edition

 Unincorporated communities in Minnesota
 Unincorporated communities in Fillmore County, Minnesota